Megadyptes ("large diver") is a genus of penguin from New Zealand.

Species 

The yellow-eyed penguin (megadyptes antipodes)  is the sole extant species in the genus Megadyptes. A smaller, recently extinct species, the Waitaha penguin (M. waitaha), was described in 2009. A 2019 study recommended classifying the Waitaha penguin as M. a. waitaha, a subspecies of the extant yellow-eyed penguin. The same 2019 study described M. a. richdalei, a recently extinct dwarf subspecies from the Chatham Islands.

Range 
Until recently, it was assumed that yellow-eyed penguins were widespread and abundant before the arrival of Polynesian settlers in New Zealand. However, genetic analysis has since revealed that its range only expanded to include mainland New Zealand in the past 200 years. Yellow-eyed penguins expanded out of the Subantarctic to replace New Zealand's endemic Waitaha penguin (M. waitaha). The Waitaha penguin became extinct between about 1300 and 1500, soon after Polynesian settlers arrived in New Zealand.  Dr Jeremy Austin, a member of the team that discovered the Waitaha penguin, said, "Our findings demonstrate that yellow-eyed penguins on mainland New Zealand are not a declining remnant of a previous abundant population, but came from the subantarctic relatively recently and replaced the extinct Waitaha penguin." 

A 2019 study recommended classifying the Waitaha penguin as M. a. waitaha, a subspecies of the extant yellow-eyed penguin. If this taxonomic revision is confirmed, then Megadyptes antipodes is native to mainland New Zealand after all.

A dwarf subspecies from the Chatham Islands, M. a. richdalei, is extinct. The modern population of yellow-eyed penguins does not breed on the Chatham Islands. 

Today, yellow-eyed penguins are found in two distinct populations, known as the northern and southern populations.

The northern population extends along the southeast coast of the South Island of New Zealand, down to Stewart Island and Codfish Island. It includes four main breeding areas in Banks Peninsula, North Otago, Otago Peninsula and the Catlins. It may also be referred to as the mainland population.

The southern population includes the Subantarctic Auckland Islands and Campbell Island.

There is little gene flow between the northern and southern populations as the large stretch of ocean between the South Island and Subantarctic region and the subtropical convergence act as a natural barrier.

References

Bird genera
Bird genera with one living species
Penguins
Spheniscidae